Ilgaz District is a district of the Çankırı Province of Turkey. Its seat is the town of Ilgaz. Its area is 845 km2, and its population is 13,700 (2021).

Composition
There is one municipality in Ilgaz District:
 Ilgaz

There are 75 villages in Ilgaz District:

 Akçaören
 Aktaş
 Alıç
 Alibey
 Alpagut
 Arpayeri
 Aşağıbozan
 Aşağıdere
 Aşağımeydan
 Aşıklar
 Balcı
 Başdibek
 Belören
 Belsöğüt
 Beyköy
 Bozatlı
 Bucura Yenice
 Bükçük
 Çaltıpınar
 Candere
 Çatak
 Çeltikbaşı
 Cömert
 Çörekçiler
 Danişment
 Eksik
 Ericek
 Eskice
 Gaziler
 Gökçeyazı
 Güneyköy
 Hacıhasan
 İkikavak
 Ilısılık
 İnköy
 Kaleköy
 Kavaklı
 Kayı
 Kazancı
 Keseköy
 Kırışlar
 Kıyısın
 Kızılibrik
 Kurmalar
 Kuşçayırı
 Kuyupınar
 Mesutören
 Musaköy
 Mülayim
 Mülayimyenice
 Ödemiş
 Okçular
 Ömerli
 Onaç
 Sağırlar
 Saraycık
 Sarmaşık
 Satılar
 Sazak
 Seki
 Serçeler
 Şeyhyunus
 Söğütcük
 Süleymanhacılar
 Yalaycık
 Yaylaören
 Yazıköy
 Yenidemirciler
 Yerkuyu
 Yeşildumlupınar
 Yukarıbozan
 Yukarıdere
 Yukarımeydan
 Yuvademirciler
 Yuvasaray

References

Districts of Çankırı Province